Leena Gandhi Tewari (born 1956/1957) is an Indian businessperson and author. She is the chairperson of USV Private Limited, a multinational pharmaceutical and biotechnology company based in Mumbai. USV was founded by her grandfather Vithal Balkrishna Gandhi in 1961. With a net worth of US$2.6 billion, Tewari is one of the richest Indians and frequently appears in Forbes magazine's list. The company specializes in diabetic and cardiovascular drugs as well as biosimilar drugs, injectables and active pharmaceutical ingredients.

Tiwari did her B.Com from the University of Mumbai and Master of Business Administration from Boston University. She is married to Prashant, who is the Managing Director of the company. She is also involved in humanitarian works and supports Dr Sushila Gandhi Centre for Underprivileged Women where girls are mentored through academic instruction, dance and computers. In 2013, Tewari wrote the biographical book on her grandfather Vithal Gandhi titled, Beyond Pipes and Dreams.

References

External links
Leena Tewari at USV Private Limited

Indian billionaires
Living people
Indian businesspeople in the pharmaceutical industry
Businesspeople from Mumbai
Female billionaires
21st-century Indian businesspeople
21st-century Indian businesswomen
20th-century Indian businesswomen
20th-century Indian businesspeople
Businesswomen from Maharashtra
Boston University School of Management alumni
University of Mumbai alumni
Women writers from Maharashtra
Year of birth missing (living people)
1950s births